Wayne Dustin (born 18 September 1965) is a Canadian former cross-country skier who competed in the 1988 Winter Olympics and in the 1992 Winter Olympics.

References

1965 births
Living people
Canadian male cross-country skiers
Olympic cross-country skiers of Canada
Cross-country skiers at the 1988 Winter Olympics
Cross-country skiers at the 1992 Winter Olympics